1. SC Vítkovice (1. SC TEMPISH Vítkovice after its sponsor) is a floorball team based in Vítkovice district of Ostrava, Czech Republic. The team was founded in 1992.

The men's team have played in the highest Czech floorball league, Superliga florbalu, since its foundation in 1993. With seven titles, it is the second most successful team of the league, after Tatran Střešovice.

The women's team have also played the highest Czech floorball league, Extraliga žen ve florbale, since its foundation in 1994. The team won six titles, what makes it also the second most successful team of the league, after Tigers Jižní Město, along with FBC Liberec.

Honours

Titles
Men:
 Superliga florbalu: 1995–96, 1996–97, 1999–00, 2008–09, 2012–13, 2013–14, and 2018–19
 Euro Floorball Cup: 2010 (2nd place)
Women:
 Extraliga žen ve florbale: 1999–00, 2013–14, 2015–16, 2017–18, 2018–19, and 2020–21
 Champions Cup: 2019 (2nd place), 2014 (2nd place)

References

External links
 Official website 
 Club profile 

Czech floorball teams
Sport in Ostrava